The Lebanon Woolen Mills are historic industrial buildings in Lebanon, Tennessee, U.S. They were built in 1909 by Dr Howard K. Edgerton. The facility was inherited by John Edgerton, who served as its president from 1914 to 1938. Edgerton was vehemently opposed to labor unions, and strongly in favor of open shops. The facility closed down in 1998.

The buildings were designed by Francis B. Warfield & Associates in the Colonial Revival architectural style. They have been listed on the National Register of Historic Places since July 12, 2007.

References

National Register of Historic Places in Wilson County, Tennessee
Colonial Revival architecture in Tennessee
Commercial buildings completed in 1909